The 12th Cinema Express Awards were held on 22 April 1992, and honoured the best of South Indian films released in 1991. The awards were announced in March.

Tamil

Telugu

Malayalam

Solidaire excellency awards 
Awards in this field were given to film producer G. Venkateswaran, playback singer S. Janaki, art director Thota Tharani and special effects artist Venky.

References 

1992 Indian film awards
Cinema Express Awards